Conkling is an unincorporated community located in Owsley County, Kentucky, United States. Its post office   closed in December 1972.

References

Unincorporated communities in Owsley County, Kentucky
Unincorporated communities in Kentucky